The Gates of Aulis is the first novel by the American writer Gladys Schmitt (1909–1972) set in a fictional version of 1940s Pittsburgh, Pennsylvania.Walton, Edith H (26 April 1942). The Gates of Aulis (review), The New York Times Book Review, p. 6

The novel tells the story of Carl Hasselmann and his sister Ellie, provincial, super-sensitive Americans who wrestle with existential questions.

References

1942 American novels
Novels set in Pittsburgh
1942 debut novels